Attack Squadron TWELVE (ATKRON TWELVE or VA-12), also known as the "Flying Ubangis" or "Clinchers", was an attack squadron of the United States Navy active during the Cold War.  From their home port at Naval Air Station Cecil Field in Florida, the squadron made more than thirty major overseas deployments aboard aircraft carriers, primarily flying A-4 Skyhawk and later the A-7E Corsair II, including two combat tours in the Vietnam War.

History

The squadron was established on May 12, 1945, as Bomber-Fighter Squadron FOUR (VBF-4) and soon after was redesignated as part of the service-wide reorganization of aircraft squadrons as Fighter Squadron TWO (VF-2A) on 15 November 1946.  Upon the Navy's return to its pre-1946 system of nomenclature, the squadron was again redesignated, this time as Fighter Squadron TWELVE (VF-12) on 2 August 1948.  Fully embracing the attack role, the squadron was given its final designation Attack Squadron TWELVE (VA-12) on 1 August 1955.

During WestPac in 1955, the squadron was part of the Navy's support of the evacuation of the Tachen Islands which were under bombardment by People's Republic of China forces.  After returning from this cruise, the squadron re-equipped with the F7U Cutlass and its role was changed from air interception to ground attack with special weapons.

In 1960, VA-12 was part of airwing of the USS Shangri-La when that carrier was deployed to counter Cuban infiltration into Guatemala and Nicaragua. The next year, the squadron returned to the area aboard USS Franklin D. Roosevelt to support the government of the Dominican Republic.

In 1963 the squadron was deployed in detachments to the USS Essex and USS Intrepid for anti-submarine warfare exercises. In August of the next year, the squadron was again on board the Roosevelt when the carrier was deployed to the eastern Mediterranean in response to trouble between Greeks and Turks on the island of Cyprus.

The squadron saw combat in Vietnam twice, in 1966 and 1970. Later in 1971, the unit relinquished the A-4 for the A-7 Corsair. 1973 and 1974 saw further trouble in the Mediterranean. 1973 saw the Yom Kippur War and 1974 the assassination of the American ambassador to Cyprus. During the 1970s the squadron's home base was at Cecil Field Naval Air Station near Jacksonville, Florida. In 1980, the Iranian hostage crisis saw the USS Dwight D. Eisenhower with the squadron on board. The ship remained at sea for 254 days continuously. Trouble in Lebanon flared in 1983, and the squadron supported the peacekeeping force in the country.

On 1 October 1986, the squadron was disestablished, ending 31 years of service as an attack unit, and ten years prior to that as a fighter unit.

Aircraft
The squadron was assigned the following aircraft as of the dates shown:
 Grumman F6F Hellcat
 F6F from 23 May 1945 and F6F-5P from May 1947
 Vought F4U Corsair
 F4U-1, F4U-1D, FG-1, and FG-1D from 23 May 1945 and F4U-4 from 30 September 1945
 Grumman F8F Bearcat
 F8F-1 and F8F-1B from May 1947
 McDonnell F2H Banshee
 F2H-1 and F2H-2 from 1 September 1950
 Vought F7U Cutlass
 F7U-3 from December 1955
 Douglas A-4 Skyhawk
 A4D-1 from April 1957, A4D-2 from January 1958, A4D-2N (A-4C) from 8 January 1962, and A-4E from 8 March 1965
 Vought A-7 Corsair II
 A-7E from 1 April 1971

Air wing assignment
The squadron was assigned to the following Air Wings as of the dates shown:
 CVG-4: 12 May 1945 (tail code "T"), redesignated
 CVAG-1: 15 November 1946 (tail code "T"), redesignated
 CVG-1: 1 September 1948 (tail code "T")
 CVG-10: 20 January 1958 (tail code "AK")
 CVG-1: 5 December 1960 (tail code "AB"), redesignated
 CVW-1: 20 December 1963 (tail code "AB")
 CVW-8: 25 August 1968 (tail code "AJ")
 CVW-7: 1971  (tail code "AG")

Incidents and accidents
 1945 October 6:  The squadron's commanding officer, Lieutenant Commander John H. Lackey, died in the crash of his SNJ during a training flight.

Gallery

See also
History of the United States Navy
List of inactive United States Navy aircraft squadrons
List of United States Navy aircraft squadrons

References

A4Skyhawk.org: VA-12 History
History.navy.mil: VA-1 thru 23

Attack squadrons of the United States Navy